"Love Me Land" is a song by Swedish singer Zara Larsson, released through TEN Music Group and Epic Records on 10 July 2020 as the lead single from Larsson's third studio album Poster Girl. It was co-written by Larsson with Julia Michaels, Justin Tranter and Jason Gill, the latter also producing the song. It has been described as a "a pulsating, attitude-filled dance-pop track."

Music video
Larsson explained to Teen Vogue that the video was filmed in Sweden, where she had been staying during the pandemic. "A difference from usual video filming is that we had the director on a link from Finland because she was not able to travel," she explains. The video contains Zara dancing with various light effects, with a mixture of portrait-style performance shots and frenetic movement.

Track listing

Charts

Certifications

|-
! colspan="3" | Streaming
|-

Release history

References

2020 singles
2020 songs
Zara Larsson songs
Epic Records singles
Music videos shot in Sweden
Songs written by Jason Gill (musician)
Songs written by Julia Michaels
Songs written by Justin Tranter
Songs written by Zara Larsson